Smalyavichy or Smolevichi is a city in Minsk Region, Belarus, and the administrative center of Smalyavichy District. It is situated on the Plisa River (a tributary of the Berezina).

Sport
The local football club is the Smolevichi, playing in the Belarusian Premier League. Its home ground is the Ozyorny Stadium.

Notes

References

External links

 The murder of the Jews of Smalyavichy during World War II, at Yad Vashem website.

Cities in Belarus
Populated places in Minsk Region
Smalyavichy District
Populated places established in the 15th century
Minsk Voivodeship
Minsk Governorate
Holocaust locations in Belarus